The 1230s was a decade of the Julian Calendar which began on January 1, 1230, and ended on December 31, 1239.

Significant people

References